Kennicott Glacier is a glacier in the U.S. state of Alaska. It trends southeast  from Mount Blackburn to its terminus at the head of the Kennicott River in the Wrangell Mountains. It is located in Wrangell-St. Elias National Park near the small town of McCarthy, Alaska and the historic ghost town of Kennecott, Alaska.

It was named in 1899 by geologist Oscar Rohn of the United States Geological Survey for Robert Kennicott, pioneer Alaska explorer and director of the scientific corps of the Western Union Telegraph Expedition in 1865.

Packsaddle Island is a nunatak located within the glacier near the base of Mount Blackburn.

The glacier is also the namesake of the Alaska Marine Highway vessel M/V Kennicott.

See also
Packsaddle Island
 List of glaciers

External links
Wrangell-St. Elias National Park information

References

Glaciers of Alaska
Glaciers of Copper River Census Area, Alaska
Glaciers of Unorganized Borough, Alaska
Wrangell–St. Elias National Park and Preserve